The UNB Reds women's ice hockey program represents the University of New Brunswick in the Atlantic University Sport conference of U Sports.

History

Return to AUS hockey
Former UNB Reds skater had filed a human rights complaint following the decision to downgrade the women’s hockey team from varsity to club status following the 2007-08 season.
 In mid-March 2008, the UNB Reds athletic department announced that five sports would become competitive club status. In addition to women’s ice hockey, men’s swimming, cross country, along with men’s and women’s wrestling were casualties of this decision. 

The program would return to varsity status for the 2018-19 Atlantic University Sport season. With an official introduction taking place on October 12, 2018, including a jersey ceremony held at Long Hall, in the Richard J. Currie Center, the captains for the new era of Reds hockey were also announced. Sydney DesRochers, a native of Woodstock, New Brunswick was named Team Captain, while Hayley Hallihan and Jennifer Bell, both from Miramichi, New Brunswick, were named assistant captains. Paige Grenier, from Olds, Alberta, became the first Red, extended an offer by head coach Sarah Hilworth, late in the summer of 2017. Ashley Stratton, from Mount Pearl, Newfoundland, became the first Atlantic Canadian recruited to the Reds, having won the Atlantic Challenge Cup in 2015.

Inaugural season
The Reds first game, which was also their Atlantic University Sport season opener took place versus the Mount Allison Mounties on October 13, 2018. The game was the Reds first women's ice hockey game since an 8-1 loss to Mount Allison in the AUS Quarterfinals on February 22, 2008. As a side note, it was also the Reds first home opener since October 27th, 2007. Jennifer Bell scored unassisted, 21 seconds into the second period, on Mounties goaltender Kaitlin Mowbray, capitalizing on a power play for the first goal of the new era. The game would go into double overtime, with Mounties skater Maddy Koughan scoring the game-winning tally. Of note, Kendra Woodland would be recognized as the Second Star of the Game, recording 32 saves.

Woodland would emerge among the team's star players in the landmark season. Participating in 23 regular season games, she would capture a trio of honours, including the Atlantic University Sport Rookie of the Year, First Team All-Star honours, plus a spot on the AUS All-Rookie Team. Winning nine games, including three shutouts, she paced all goaltenders in conference play with a sparkling .945 save percentage, ranking eighth overall in U Sports play.

Statistically, Tammy Kehler would finish as the Reds leading scorer, amassing 16 points, on the strength of 10 assists. Jennifer Bell and Lillian George would tie for the team lead in goals scored with 7. Between the pipes, Kendra Woodland amassed 23 appearances, recording a Goals Against Average of 1.73 and a save percentage of .945.

Qualifying for the playoffs in the first season of their return, the Reds faced off against the UPEI Panthers program in the Subway Atlantic University Sport quarter-final series. Enjoying a 3-0 lead in Game One, the Reds would prevail in a 3-2 final, to win the first playoff game of the new era. Goals were scored by Lillian George, Ashley Stratton and Paige Grenier.

Roster

2020s
Among the first key departures in the new era involved the resignation of Brittany Esposito from the coaching staff in April 2020. Having won the Clarkson Cup in 2016 with the Calgary Inferno, Esposito, a former CWHL All-Star, was part of Hilworth’s staff for the Reds first two seasons.

Season-by-season Record 
{| class="wikitable"
|-
| style="background:#fea;"|Won Championship
| style="background:#dfd;"|<small>'Lost Championship</small>
| style="background:#d0e7ff;"|Conference Champions
| style="background:#fbb;"|League Leader
|-
|
|
|
|
|}

Team captains
2018-19: Sydney DesRochers (assistants: Hayley Hallihan and Jennifer Bell)2019-20: Sydney DesRochers
2021-22: Paige Grenier  (assistants: Jenna MacLean, Ashley Stratton, Frederike Cyr, Amanda Desrochers and Katherine Chadwick)

Season team scoring champion

Rivalries

Mount Allison University

St. Thomas Tommies

Awards and honours

AUS Awards
Kendra Woodland, 2018-19 AUS Rookie of the Year
Ashley Stratton, 2019-20 AUS Most Sportsmanlike Player
Ashley Stratton, 2021-22 AUS Most Sportsmanlike Player
Sarah Hilworth, 2021-22 AUS Coach of the Year
Jana Headrick, 2021-22 AUS Community Service Award
Jenna MacLean, 2021-22 AUS Defensive Player of the Year

AUS All-Stars
Kendra Woodland, Goaltender: 2018-19 AUS First Team All-Star
Jenna MacLean, Defence: 2018-19 AUS Second Team All-Star
Jenna MacLean, Defence: 2021-22 AUS First Team All-Star
Kendra Woodland, Goaltender: 2021-22 AUS First Team All-Star

AUS All-Rookies
Kendra Woodland: 2018-19 AUS All-Rookie Team
Jenna MacLean, 2018-19 AUS All-Rookie Team

Pre 2008 awards
2000-01: Lynda Robinson, Forward, AUS Rookie of the Year 
2001-02: Emily Hobbs, Goaltender, AUS Rookie of the Year 
2005-06: Terri Ryerson, Goaltender, AUS Rookie of the Year 
2005-06: Meghan Ward, AUS Most Sportsmanlike Player
2005-06: Terri Ryerson, Goaltender, CIS All-Rookie Team

U Sports Awards
Jana Headrick, 2022 Marion Hilliard Award

All-Canadians
Ashley	Stratton, Forward, 2019-20 Second Team

References 

Sport in Fredericton
 U Sports women's ice hockey teams
Ice hockey teams in New Brunswick
University of New Brunswick
Women in New Brunswick